Kitty Godfree defeated Lilí de Álvarez 6–2, 4–6, 6–3 to win the Ladies' Singles at the 1926 Wimbledon Championships.

Suzanne Lenglen was the defending champion, but withdrew from her third round match against Claire Beckingham.

Draw

Finals

Top half

Section 1

Section 2

Bottom half

Section 3

Section 4

References

External links

Women's Singles
Wimbledon Championship by year – Women's singles
Wimbledon Championships - singles
Wimbledon Championships - singles